The Ludhiana–Fazilka line is a railway line connecting  and  both  in the Indian state of the Punjab . The line is under the administrative jurisdiction of Northern Railway.

History
The line passed through Rohtak-Jind-Bhatinda-Muktasar-Fazilka-Bahawalnagar and provided direct connection through Samma Satta (now in Pakistan) to Karachi. The extension from the Macleodganj (later renamed Mandi Sadiqganj and now in Pakistan) railway line to Ambala via Qasamwala-Hindumalkote-Abohar-Bhatinda-Patiala was opened by the same company in 1902.

Railway border crossings
Fazilka and Hussainiwala on this line are two defunct railway border crossing points on the India–Pakistan border. After partition of India, a  line linked Amruka on the Pakistan side of the India–Pakistan border, opposite Fazilka, towards Samma Satta. The Hussainiwala–Ganda Singh Wala railway crossing, near Firozpur, became defunct with the partition of India. The  broad gauge line from Kasur Junction in Pakistan has been closed. A strategically important  Kaiser-E-Hind Rail-cum-Road Bridge was blown up during the Indo-Pakistani War of 1971 at Hussainiwala, and was never rebuilt. In 2013, Sutlej Barrage Bridge on Hussainiwala was opened after restructuring.

Loco sheds
Ludhiana diesel shed holds 170+ locos including WDM-2, WDM-3A and WDG-3A. Ludhiana electric loco shed was commissioned in 2001 and houses WAM-4, WAG-5 and WAG-7 locos.

Developments
The  new -wide  broad gauge line between Fazilka and Abohar declared on 2010, was opened in 2012.

The Indian Railways have been considering proposals for converting the existing  Ludhiana–Firozpur single line into a double line.

Passenger movement
 is the only station on this line which is amongst the top hundred booking stations of Indian Railway.

Railway reorganisation
Sind Railway (later reorganised as Scinde, Punjab & Delhi Railway) was formed a guaranteed railway in 1856. It constructed broad-gauge railways from Delhi to Multan via Lahore, and from Karachi to Kotri. Multan and Kotri were connected by ferry service on the Indus River. In 1871–72, Indus Valley Railway was formed to connect Multan and Kotri. At the same time, Punjab Northern State Railway started constructing from Lahore towards Peshawar. In 1886, Sind, Punjab and Delhi Railway was acquired by the state and amalgamated with Indus Valley Railway and Punjab Northern State Railway to form North-Western State Railway. Southern Punjab Railway was taken over by the state and merged with North Western Railway in 1930.

With the partition of India in 1947, North Western Railway was split. While the western portion became Pakistan West Railway, and later Pakistan Railways, the eastern part became Eastern Punjab Railway. In 1952,Northern Railway was formed with a portion of East Indian Railway Company west of Mughalsarai, Jodhpur Railway, Bikaner Railway and Eastern Punjab Railway.

References

External links
 Trains at Ludhiana
 Trains at Firozpur
Trains at Fazilka

5 ft 6 in gauge railways in India
Rail transport in Punjab, India

Railway lines opened in 1905
Transport in Ludhiana
Transport in Firozpur
1905 establishments in India